The Argead dynasty, also known as the Temenid dynasty, was an ancient Macedonian royal house of Dorian Greek provenance. They were the founders and the ruling dynasty of the kingdom of Macedon from about 700 to 310 BC.

Their tradition, as described in ancient Greek historiography, traced their origins to Argos, of Peloponnese in Southern Greece, hence the name Argeads or Argives. Initially rulers of the tribe of the same name, by the time of Philip II they had expanded their reign further, to include under the rule of Macedonia all Upper Macedonian states. The family's most celebrated members were Philip II of Macedon and his son Alexander the Great, under whose leadership the kingdom of Macedonia gradually gained predominance throughout Greece, defeated the Achaemenid Empire and expanded as far as Egypt and India. The mythical founder of the Argead dynasty is King Caranus. The Argeads claimed descent from Herakles through his great-great-grandson Temenus, also king of Argos.

Origin

The words Argead and Argive derive (via Latin Argīvus) from the Greek Ἀργεῖος (Argeios meaning "of or from Argos"), which is first attested in Homer where it was also used as a collective designation for the Greeks ("Ἀργείων Δαναῶν", Argive Danaans). The Argead dynasty claimed descent from the Temenids of Argos, in the Peloponnese, whose legendary ancestor was Temenus, the great-great-grandson of Heracles.

In the excavations of the royal palace at Aegae, Manolis Andronikos discovered in the "tholos" room (according to some scholars "tholos" was the throne room) a Greek inscription relating to that belief. This is testified by Herodotus, in The Histories, where he mentions that three brothers of the lineage of Temenus, Gauanes, Aeropus and Perdiccas, fled from Argos to the Illyrians and then to Upper Macedonia, to a town called Lebaea, where they served the king. The latter asked them to leave his territory, believing in an omen that something great would happen to Perdiccas. The boys went to another part of Macedonia, near the garden of Midas, above which mount Bermio stands. There they made their abode and slowly formed their own kingdom.

Herodotus also relates the incident of the participation of Alexander I of Macedon in the Olympic Games in 504 or 500 BC where the participation of the Macedonian king was contested by participants on the grounds that he was not Greek. The Hellanodikai, however, after examining his Argead claim confirmed that the Macedonian kings were Greeks and allowed him to participate.

Another theory supported by the Greek historian Miltiades Hatzopoulos, following the opinion of the ancient author Appian, is that the Argead dynasty actually came from Argos Orestikon.According to Thucydides, in the History of the Peloponnesian War, the Argeads were originally Temenids from Argos, who descended from the highlands to Lower Macedonia, expelled the Pierians from Pieria and acquired in Paionia a narrow strip along the river Axios extending to Pella and the sea. They also added Mygdonia in their territory through the expulsion of the Edoni, Eordians, and Almopians.

History

Succession disputes 
The death of the king almost invariably triggered dynastic disputes and often a war of succession between members of the Argead family, leading to political and economic instability. These included:
 Six-year Macedonian interregnum (399–393 BCE), after the death of king Archelaus, between Orestes, Aeropus II, Amyntas II and Pausanias
 Macedonian war of succession (393–392 BCE), after the death of king Pausanias, between Amyntas III and Argaeus II
 Macedonian war of succession (369–368 BCE), after the death of king Amyntas III, between Ptolemy of Aloros and Alexander II of Macedon
 Macedonian war of succession (360–359 BCE), after the death of king Perdiccas III, between Philip II (who deposed Amyntas IV), Argeus (supported by Athens), Pausanias (supported by Thrace) and Archelaus (supported by the Chalcidian League)
 Wars of the Diadochi (323–277 BCE), after the death of king Alexander the Great, between his Diadochi ("Successors")

Additionally, long-established monarchs could still face a rebellion by a relative when the former's kingship was perceived to be weak. An example was Philip's rebellion against his older brother, king Perdiccas II, in the prelude to the Peloponnesian War (433–431 BCE).

List of rulers

Family tree

References

Citations

Sources

Further reading

External links

 
States and territories established in the 9th century BC
States and territories disestablished in the 4th century BC
Ancient Macedonian dynasties
Babylonian dynasties
Royalty of Macedonia (ancient kingdom)
Mythology of Macedonia (ancient kingdom)
9th-century BC establishments in Greece
4th-century BC disestablishments in Greece